Paloniemi is a surname. Notable people with the surname include:

Aila Paloniemi (born 1956), Finnish politician
Santeri Paloniemi (born 1993), Finnish alpine skier

Finnish-language surnames